Hendrik Frederik "Erik" le Roux (born 24 February 1988) is a South African professional rugby union player who last played for the . His regular position is flanker or eighth man.

Career

Youth and Varsity Cup rugby

Le Roux played high school rugby at Grey College in Bloemfontein and represented his provincial side, Free State, at several youth tournaments. In 2005, he played for their Under-18 side at the Academy Week tournament and the following year at the Under-18 Craven Week tournament. He was a member of the  side that played in the 2007 Under-19 Provincial Championship and of the  side that played in the Under-21 Provincial Championship in 2008. In 2009, he moved to Kimberley-based side , where he played for their Under-21 side in the 2009 Under-21 Provincial Championship.

He also played Varsity Cup rugby for the Bloemfontein-based university side  for four seasons from 2010 to 2013, making fourteen appearances and scoring two tries in 2013. He was also named their Varsity Cup Forward of the Year in 2013.

Free State Cheetahs

He made his first class debut in 2011.

Griffons

While that turned out to be his only match for the Free State Cheetahs' senior side, he did join their opponents in that match, Welkom-based  prior to the 2011 Currie Cup First Division season. Four more appearances – all as a replacement – followed in the 2012 Vodacom Cup, before playing in ten matches during the 2012 Currie Cup First Division competition.

He was a key member of their 2014 Currie Cup First Division-winning side. He played off the bench in the final and helped the Griffons win the match 23–21 to win their first trophy for six years.

References

1988 births
Living people
Free State Cheetahs players
Griffons (rugby union) players
Rugby union flankers
Rugby union number eights
Rugby union players from Bloemfontein
South African rugby union players